David Ryan Long is an American author of two novels. His debut novel Ezekiel's Shadow won the 2002 Christy Award for Best First Fiction. According to WorldCat, the book is held in 541 libraries  Quinlin's Estate is his second novel; according to WorldCat, it is in 338 libraries

References

American male writers
Living people
Year of birth missing (living people)
Place of birth missing (living people)